Indigo carmine, or 5,5′-indigodisulfonic acid sodium salt, is an organic salt derived from indigo by aromatic sulfonation, which renders the compound soluble in water. It is approved for use as a food colorant in the U.S and E.U. to produce a blue color. It has the E number E132. It is also a pH indicator.

Uses

Indigo carmine in a 0.2% aqueous solution is blue at pH 11.4 and yellow at 13.0. Indigo carmine is also a redox indicator, turning yellow upon reduction. Another use is as a dissolved ozone indicator through the conversion to isatin-5-sulfonic acid. This reaction has been shown not to be specific to ozone, however: it also detects superoxide, an important distinction in cell physiology. It is also used as a dye in the manufacturing of capsules.

Medical uses 

Indigotindisulfonate sodium, sold under the brand name Bludigo, is used as a diagnostic dye during surgical procedures. It is indicated for use as a visualization aid in the cystoscopic assessment of the integrity of the ureters in adults following urological and gynecological open, robotic, or endoscopic surgical procedures. It was approved for medical use in the United States in July 2022.

In obstetric surgery, indigo carmine solutions are sometimes employed to detect amniotic fluid leaks. In urologic surgery, intravenous injection of indigo carmine is often used to highlight portions of the urinary tract. The dye is filtered rapidly by the kidneys from the blood, and colors the urine blue. This enables structures of the urinary tract to be seen in the surgical field, and demonstrate if there is a leak. However, the dye can cause a potentially dangerous increase in blood pressure in some cases.

Although not absorbed by the cells, indigo carmine stain, sprayed onto regions of interest, highlights the topography of the mucosal surface with its blue coloring. Generally used at a concentration around 0.2%, indigo carmine stain is useful as a screening method for diagnosing minute lesions, to differentiate between benign and malignant lesions, as well as to facilitate application of magnifying endoscopes to observe and analyze the surface structure of a lesion, delineate boundaries of early stage malignant lesions and estimate the invasion depth of cancer. It has been used to diagnose Barrett’s esophagus, evaluate villous atrophy, diagnose and discriminate polypoid and non-polypoid lesions in the colon, and diagnose gastric adenoma and cancer.

References

External links 
 

PH indicators
Sulfonates
Organic sodium salts
Indoles
Enones
Food colorings
Redox indicators
E-number additives
Acid dyes